Conor Thomas (born 29 October 1993) is an English professional footballer who plays as a midfielder for League Two club Crewe Alexandra. He has previously played for Coventry City, where he made 100 senior appearances, and later played for Swindon Town, former Indian Super League club ATK and Cheltenham Town.

Club career
Thomas joined the Coventry City Academy after being spotted playing for local side Christ The King FC.
He made his professional debut as a substitute on 8 January 2011 in a 2–1 FA Cup win over Crystal Palace, coming on to replace Gary McSheffrey after 72 minutes and made his full debut for the club on 25 January, again during an FA Cup tie, against Birmingham City.

He joined Premier League club Liverpool initially on loan on 31 January 2011, with a view to a permanent move but after playing and training with Liverpool's reserves and training with the first team on seven occasions he returned to Coventry after a hamstring injury and the mutual decision to end the loan. Thomas scored his first senior goal on 31 January 2012 in a 2–1 defeat away to Blackpool, opening the scoring in the 59th minute.

After a six-year spell at Coventry, Thomas was released by the club in June 2016.

On 4 July 2016, preceding his release from Coventry, Thomas joined fellow League One side Swindon Town on a three-year deal. On 6 August 2016, Thomas made his Swindon Town debut in a 1–0 victory against his former side; Coventry City, featuring for the entire 90 minutes. On 25 March 2017, Thomas scored his first goal for Swindon, netting the winner in their 1–0 victory over Millwall in the 90th minute.

On 23 August 2017, Thomas joined Indian Super League side ATK.

On 25 May 2018, Thomas made the return to England to join League Two side Cheltenham Town on a two-year deal. He helped Cheltenham to the 2019–20 League Two play-off semi-finals, only to lose 3-2 on aggregate against Northampton Town. On 6 May 2022, Thomas was released by the club after not being offered a further contract, and on 19 May 2022, he joined Crewe Alexandra. He started in Crewe's opening game of the 2022–23 season, a 2–1 victory over Rochdale at Spotland.

International career
Thomas was an England under-17 international. He played in the final of the 2009 Nordic Tournament and was awarded a winner's medal following the side's victory over Scotland.

Career statistics

Honours

Cheltenham Town
League Two Champions: 2020–21

References

External links
Conor Thomas profile at the Football Association website

1993 births
Living people
Footballers from Coventry
English footballers
England youth international footballers
Association football midfielders
Coventry City F.C. players
Liverpool F.C. players
Swindon Town F.C. players
ATK (football club) players
Cheltenham Town F.C. players
English Football League players
Indian Super League players
Expatriate footballers in India
English expatriate footballers
English expatriate sportspeople in India